Cycloloba is a genus of beetles in the family Carabidae, containing the following species:

 Cycloloba septemguttata (Fabricius, 1794)
 Cycloloba truncatipennis (Boheman, 1848)

References

Anthiinae (beetle)